Drew Radovich (born June 20, 1985 in Mission Viejo, California) is a former American football offensive tackle. He played college football at Southern California.

Radovich has also been a member of the San Francisco 49ers and Indianapolis Colts.

Early years
He graduated from Mission Viejo High School where Ryan Powdrell and Mark Sanchez went.  He played in the 2003 U.S. Army All-American Bowl.

Professional career

First stint with Vikings
On April 27, 2008 Radovich was signed as an undrafted free agent by the Minnesota Vikings.

Radovich made the 53 man active roster his rookie year.  He suffered a shoulder injury during his first preseason game against the Seahawks. Midway through the season, Radovich was placed on IR and underwent shoulder surgery to focus on entering the 2009 fully healthy. Radovich was cut in early September 2009.

San Francisco 49ers
Radovich was signed to the San Francisco 49ers practice squad September 2009 where he spent half of the season until being released to make room for an injury to another position group.

Indianapolis Colts
Radovich was signed to the Indianapolis Colts' practice squad on December 2, 2009.

Second stint with Vikings
Radovich was re-signed to the Vikings practice squad on December 9.

Radovich played in all 4 preseason games, starting the 4th and final game against the Dallas Cowboys.

Radovich was cut from the Vikings on September 4, 2010.

References

External links

USC Trojans bio

1985 births
Living people
Players of American football from California
American football offensive tackles
USC Trojans football players
Minnesota Vikings players
San Francisco 49ers players
Sportspeople from Mission Viejo, California
Indianapolis Colts players
Mission Viejo High School alumni